Saints Peter and Paul Church is a historic former Roman Catholic church in the East Liberty neighborhood of Pittsburgh, Pennsylvania. It is often referred to colloquially as the "Dogma Church" because of its appearance in the climactic scene of the 1999 Kevin Smith film Dogma. The church was built in 1890–91 and was designed by Adolphus Druiding. After being badly damaged in a fire in 1909, the interior and roof were rebuilt under the supervision of architect John T. Comès and the church was rededicated in 1910. It closed in 1992 and has remained vacant since. In 1983, the church was designated as a Pittsburgh Landmark by the Pittsburgh History & Landmarks Foundation (PHLF).

History
Saints Peter and Paul was a German parish established in 1857. The first church was completed in 1859 but was in poor condition by the 1880s. It was demolished in 1890 and work began on the present church shortly after. The cornerstone was laid on August 10, 1890, and the finished building was dedicated by Bishop Richard Phelan on December 20, 1891.

On August 5, 1909, the church was struck by lightning, igniting a fire that destroyed the inside of the building. The Pittsburgh Gazette Times reported:

Joseph Suehr, the church's pastor, wrote,

Nuns and firefighters were able to save some of the most valuable items from the church, including the altar, but the interior and roof needed to be completely rebuilt. The total cost of repairs was $85,000, almost as much as the initial construction, but was mostly covered by insurance. The building was rededicated by Bishop Regis Canevin on October 30, 1910.

Due to population loss in the Diocese of Pittsburgh, Saints Peter and Paul was merged with five other East End parishes in 1992 to form St. Charles Lwanga Parish. Three of the churches, Holy Rosary and Mother of Good Counsel in Homewood and Our Lady of the Most Blessed Sacrament in East Hills, remained open, while Saints Peter and Paul, Our Lady Help of Christians in Larimer, and Corpus Christi in Lincoln–Lemington–Belmar were closed. The church was sold in 1997 and has been vacant since.

In 2018, it was placed under the conservatorship of a nonprofit community development organization, East Liberty Development, Inc. (ELDI), which has been trying to find a way to reuse the structure. In 2022, a feasibility study commissioned by ELDI concluded that the church could be viably renovated as a multi-purpose events space for a cost of about $15 million.

Architecture
Saints Peter and Paul was designed in the Gothic Revival style and is attributed to Adolphus Druiding, of Chicago, while local architect John T. Comès was responsible for the 1910 reconstruction. Both architects specialized in Catholic churches. The front elevation of the church includes two towers with  spires.

The rebuilding by Comès resulted in a number of changes to the building. Suehr wrote,

Inside, the original wood and plaster columns were replaced with stone and the wooden roof was replaced with steel and reinforced concrete.

References

Pittsburgh History & Landmarks Foundation Historic Landmarks
Roman Catholic churches in Pittsburgh
Roman Catholic churches completed in 1891
Former Roman Catholic church buildings in Pennsylvania
19th-century Roman Catholic church buildings in the United States
Unused buildings in Pennsylvania